is a manga-style story book written by Katsuhiro Otomo and illustrated by Shinji Kimura. The manga is licensed in English by Dark Horse Comics. The manga was adapted into an anime and broadcast on NHK BS-2 from December 21–25, 2009.

Media

Manga
Shufu-to-Seikatsu Sha Ltd. released the manga in September 2002. The manga is licensed in English by Dark Horse Comics, which released the manga on August 24, 2005. Casterman released the manga on October 17, 2007.

Anime
The manga was adapted into an anime and broadcast on NHK BS-2's BS Fuyu Yasumi Anime Tokusen program for five consecutive days starting from December 21, 2009. The anime featured Yumiko Kobayashi as Hipira, Sayaka Ohara as Soul, Bin Shimada as Chōrō, Chihiro Suzuki as Georuge and Ayumi Fujimura as Erena.

Reception
Newtype USA magazine commends Shinji Kimura's artwork saying that his illustrations are both "creepy and cute".

References

External links

Official Hipira website 

2002 manga
2009 Japanese television series debuts
2009 Japanese television series endings
Shōnen manga
Comedy anime and manga
Katsuhiro Otomo
NHK original programming
Sunrise (company)
Supernatural anime and manga
Vampires in anime and manga